Mira Alečković (2 February 1924, Novi Sad – 27 February 2008) was a Serbian and Yugoslav poet.

Biography
She received a degree in Slavic Studies in Belgrade, and went to further study at the Sorbonne. She participated in the pre-World War II leftist movement. During the World War II in Yugoslavia she participated in Yugoslav Partisans movement actions. In Socialist Yugoslavia she gained considerable popularity, especially for her children's poetry and partisan songs.

Her works have been translated in more than 20 languages.

Works
Collections of poems
 Zvezdane balade, 1946
Pionirsko proleće, 1955
Prijatelji, 1956
Lastavica, 1957
Srebrni voz, 1963
Sunčani soliteri, 1970
Da život bude ljubav, 1972
Sanjalica, 1975
Ne mogu bez snova, 1980
Staza srebrom izvezena, 1982

Novels
Srebrna Kosa, 1953
Zbogom velika tajno, 1960
Zašto grdiš reku?
Jutro

References

External links

Translated works by Mira Alečković

1924 births
2008 deaths
Writers from Novi Sad
Serbian women poets
20th-century Serbian poets
Yugoslav poets